Reduction fisheries are fisheries that "reduce," or process their catch, into fishmeal and fish oil. They rely largely on small and medium-sized pelagic species; that is, fish found in the upper layers of the open sea, such as menhaden, anchovies, and sardines.

External links 
 On the relationship between aquaculture and reduction fisheries | Frank Asche and Sigbjørn Tveterås | Center for Fisheries Economics, Norwegian School of Economics and Business Administration

Fish processing